This is a list of venues used for professional baseball in Washington, D.C.. The information is a compilation of the information contained in the references listed.

Olympic Grounds
Home of:
Olympic – independent (1870), NA (1871–1872)
National – NA (1872–1873)
Location: 16th Street NW (east); 17th Street NW (west); S Street NW (south) – about a mile west-southwest of the eventual site of Griffith Stadium
Currently: residential, commercial

Athletic Park
Home of: Washington Nationals a.k.a. Statesmen – AA (1884 part)
Location: S Street NW (south); T Street NW (north); 9th Street NW (east) – about a quarter mile southwest of the eventual site of Griffith Stadium
Currently: Residential

Capitol Grounds a.k.a. Capitol Park (I) a.k.a. Union Association Park
Home of: Washington Nationals (UA) – UA (1884) / Eastern League (1885)
Location: C Street NE (north); Delaware Avenue NE (west): B Street (now Constitution Avenue) NE (south); First Street NE (east) – a couple of blocks northeast of the Capitol building
Currently: Russell Senate Office Building

Swampoodle Grounds a.k.a. Capitol Park (II)
Home of: 
Washington Nationals – NL (1886–1889)
Washington Senators – Atlantic Association (1890) 
Also used as a neutral site for one game in the 1887 World Series
Location: North Capitol Street NE and tracks (west); F Street NE (south); Delaware Avenue NE (east); G Street NE (north) – a couple of blocks north of the first Capitol Park – in the Swampoodle neighborhood
Currently: National Postal Museum and Union Station National Visitors Center

Griffith Stadium prev. Boundary Field, National Park, American League Park (II) 
Home of:
Washington Senators – AA (1891), NL (1892–1899)
Washington Senators/Nationals – AL (1904–1960)
Washington Senators – AL (1961)
Homestead Grays – Negro leagues (1937–1948) part-time home
Location: Georgia Avenue (extension of 7th Street – formerly Brightwood) NW (west, first base); Florida Avenue NW, Bohrer Street NW, and U Street NW (south, right field); 5th Street NW (east, left/center field); Howard University buildings and W Street NW (north, third base)
Currently: Howard University Hospital

American League Park (I)
Home of: Washington Senators/Nationals – AL (1901–1903)
Location: Florida Avenue NE (southwest, first base); Trinidad Avenue NE (northwest, third base)
Currently: Residential area

RFK Stadium orig. D.C. Stadium
Home of: 
Washington Senators – AL (1962–1971)
Washington Nationals – NL (2005–2007)
Location: 2400 East Capitol Street SE – T's into 22nd Street SE (west, home plate); Independence Avenue SE (south/southeast, right field);  C Street NE (north/northeast, left field)
Currently: Unoccupied

Nationals Park
Home of: Washington Nationals – NL (2008–present)
Location: 1500 South Capitol Street SE – Capitol Street (west, third base); N Street SE (north, left-center field); 1st Street SE (east, right field); Potomac Avenue SE (south, first base)

See also
Lists of baseball parks

References
Peter Filichia, Professional Baseball Franchises, Facts on File, 1993.
Mark Okkonen, Baseball Memories 1900–1909, Sterling Publishing, 1992.
Michael Gershman, Diamonds: The Evolution of the Ballpark, Houghton Mifflin, 1993.

Washington, D.C.
Lists of buildings and structures in Washington, D.C.
Washington, D.C., sport-related lists